Chrysolina fuliginosa is a species of beetle from a family of Chrysomelidae, that can be found in France, Northern Italy, Northern Spain, and West Germany.

Description
Both sexes of the species are gray, though females are larger than males.

References

Beetles described in 1807
Chrysomelinae
Taxa named by Guillaume-Antoine Olivier